The UA University" is the official Ukrainian organization founded with support of Ministry of Education and Science of Ukraine. Meanwhile, UA University is a private company and a part of NAUKAUA LLC.

History
On April 11, 2006, it was decided to create international organization that will helps international students with admission and education abroad. 
After analyzing the situation, it was revealed that students experience difficulties when entering abroad. This is primarily due to the fake agents. The new organization should resolve this problem.
The Ukrainian Admission Center was launched on a test mode. A year later, after the analysis of it work, similar centers will be launched in several other countries:  Russia, Belarus, Georgia and Poland, Perhaps in Hungary, Cyprus, Kazakhstan
 
UA University was founded on 14 May 2006. In first month of work there was more than 1500 applications from foreign students.

Since January 2007 Ukrainian Admission Center works in normal mode, and is listed on the Ukrainian Stock Exchange (PFTS), and the agency is 50% owned by Ukrainian universities.

Structures
The center consists of the central body with headquarter in Kharkiv and offices in the largest universities in regional centers:
Kyiv
Vinnytsia
Dnipro
Zhytomyr
Zaporizhia
Ivano-Frankivsk
Lutsk
Lviv
Mykolaiv
Odessa
Poltava
Rivne
Sumy
Ternopil
Kharkiv
Kherson

See also
Ministry of Education and Science of Ukraine
Cabinet of Ministers of Ukraine
Higher education in Ukraine
List of universities in Ukraine

References

External links 
 Official Website of the Ukrainian Ministry of Education
 Official Website of the Ukrainian Admission Center
 NaukaUa - Study Abroad for International students
 

Education
Education
Ukraine, Education
1992 establishments in Ukraine
Ministry of Education (Ukraine)
Ukraine
Ukraine
University and college admissions